Anita Anand (born 1972) is a British radio and television presenter, journalist, and author.

Early life and education
Anand was born on 28 April 1972 in London, England, to Punjabi parents who migrated to India shortly after the partition of India and then, later, to the UK.  Her family, prior to the partition, originated from a village near the Northwest Frontier Province and Afghanistan.

Anand was privately educated at Bancroft's School in Woodford Green in Redbridge, east London. Anand then entered King's College, London, in 1990, graduating with a BA in English in 1993.

Broadcasting career
After training as a journalist, Anand became European Head of News and Current Affairs for Zee TV, and one of the youngest TV news editors in Britain at the age of 25. She presented the talk show The Big Debate and was political correspondent for Zee TV presenting the Raj Britannia series – 31 documentaries chronicling the political aspirations of the Asian community in the most marginal constituencies in 1997.

Until October 2007, Anand presented in the 10:00 pm till 1:00 am slot on Monday to Thursdays on BBC Radio 5 Live. She went on to co-present the station's weekday Drive (4:00–7:00 pm) slot with Peter Allen, having replaced Jane Garvey in 2007. Aasmah Mir replaced her when she left for maternity leave.

Anand has presented the BBC Radio 4 show Midweek, and on television she has been a presenter on the Heaven and Earth Show. She has co-presented the Daily Politics on BBC Two with Andrew Neil from September 2008, with a break for maternity leave from January to September 2010.

In July 2011 Anand left the Daily Politics to present a new show called Double Take on Radio 5 Live on Sunday mornings. In June 2012, Anand took over from Jonathan Dimbleby as the presenter of Radio 4's Any Answers?  Saturday current affairs phone-in programme between 2:00 and 2:45 pm.

In 2022, Anand teamed up with historian William Dalrymple to create the podcast Empire, which examines the British East India Company and British involvement and influence on India. The pair had previously collaborated on the book Koh-i-Noor: The History of the World's Most Infamous Diamond.

Newspaper journalism
Anand has also written articles for India Today and The Asian Age newspaper, and used to write a regular column in The Guardian ("Anita Anand's Diary", 2004–2005).

Publications
 Anand, Anita. (2015) Sophia: Princess, Suffragette, Revolutionary. Bloomsbury Publishing, . It tells the story of the Indian princess Sophia Duleep Singh, granddaughter of the last Sikh Maharani and Maharaja of Lahore. She was born in exile in England, and went on to struggle for causes including Indian independence, the welfare of Indian soldiers in the First World War and women's suffrage. Anand also presented Sophia, Suffragette Princess, a 30-minute television documentary programme based on the book, which aired first on BBC One in late November 2015. 
Dalrymple, William; Anand, Anita (2017).  Koh-i-Noor: The History of the World's Most Infamous Diamond. Bloomsbury Publishing, .
 Anand, Anita (2019). The Patient Assassin: A True Tale of Massacre, Revenge and the Raj. Simon and Schuster (UK) Scribner (US), . It is based on the life of Indian revolutionary Udham Singh and the Amritsar massacre of 1919.

Awards
On 18 November 2005, Anand won the Nazia Hassan Award for 2005 in the category of Upcoming Television Broadcasters. Her book The Patient Assassin won the 2020 Hessell-Tiltman Prize.

Personal life
Anand married science writer Simon Singh in 2007. The couple have two sons and live in Richmond, London.

Anand is a patron of the Richmond Society and of the Museum of Richmond.

See also
 List of British Indians

References

External links
 Official website
 Any Answers? (BBC Radio 4)
 
   
 

1972 births
Living people
21st-century English writers
21st-century British women writers
Alumni of King's College London
BBC newsreaders and journalists
BBC Radio 4 presenters
BBC Radio 5 Live presenters
English journalists
British writers of Indian descent
English people of Indian descent
English people of Punjabi descent
People educated at Bancroft's School
People from London
The Guardian people